Etchesia is a genus of muensterellid stem-octopod from the Kimmeridge Clay Formation of southern England. It is monotypic, consisting solely of type species E. martilli.<ref name="fuchs2017"/

References 

Octopuses
Prehistoric cephalopod genera